Galina Marinova (born 20 April 1985) is a retired Bulgarian rhythmic gymnast. She competed at the 2000 Summer Olympics in the group event and finished seventh.

References

1985 births
Living people
Gymnasts at the 2000 Summer Olympics
Olympic gymnasts of Bulgaria
Bulgarian rhythmic gymnasts